Desislava Stoyanova (born 10 April 1992) is a retired Bulgarian biathlete. She was born in Berkovitsa. She competed at six Biathlon World Championships between 2011 and 2017, and at the 2014 and 2018 Winter Olympics. Her best individual result in the Biathlon World Cup is a 22nd place in the sprint. Her best individual result at World Championships is the 38th place in the sprint at the Biathlon World Championships 2015. Her best Olympic individual result is the 61st place in the sprint at the 2014 Winter Olympics. She is engaged to fellow biathlete Dimitar Gerdzhikov from whom she has one child.

References

External links

1992 births
Living people
Biathletes at the 2014 Winter Olympics
Biathletes at the 2018 Winter Olympics
Bulgarian female biathletes
Olympic biathletes of Bulgaria
21st-century Bulgarian women